The 2018 Iowa Attorney General election took place on November 6, 2018, to elect the Attorney General of Iowa. The election was held concurrently with that year's gubernatorial election.

Incumbent Democratic Attorney General Tom Miller won re-election with 76.5% of the vote. The Republican Party did not nominate anyone, but the Libertarian Party nominated Marco Battaglia.

Democratic primary

Candidates

Nominee 

 Tom Miller, incumbent Attorney General

Other candidates

Libertarian Party

Nominee 

 Marco Battaglia, 2014 gubernatorial candidate

General election

Results 
Tom Miller won re-election in landslide victory with 76.51% of the vote.

References 

Attorney General
Iowa
Iowa Attorney General elections